Football Coach

Abdelhamid "Mido" Hassan (born 24 September 1972) is an Egyptian footballer. He retired the football field in 2011. He plays in the striker position for Egypt's Ittihad.

Career
Abdelhamid started his career when he was 28 years old.

Abdelhamid holds the record for the 2nd fastest goal scored in the history of Egyptian football competitions. The goal took place in a match in 2006 with ENPPI against Ghazl El-Mehalla, after just 13 seconds of play-time.

Abdelhamid transferred to El-Ahly in January 2007. He was injured on 23 Feb 2007 in a game against Tersana, and was side-lined for 8 weeks.

Abdelhamid retired in 2011 from ittihad el sakandary club.

Abdelhamid worked as a tv representer in AlAhly tv.

Abdelhamid worked as a coach in enppi , arab contractors , petrojet , baldeyet el mahala and ceramica cleopatra.

Honours
 Winner of Egyptian League (2006–2007).
 Winner of Egyptian Soccer Cup 2007.
 Winner of African Super Cup 2007.
 Winner of Egyptian Cup 2005.

References

1972 births
Sportspeople from Giza
Al Ahly SC players
Egyptian footballers
Association football forwards
Living people
Al Ittihad Alexandria Club players
Egyptian Premier League players